Jean-Gabin Moubeke (born 3 March 1982) is an Ivorian former footballer who played as a forward for Nice and US Cagnes.

Career statistics

References

External links 
 

Living people
Brentford F.C. players
Association football forwards
Ligue 2 players
1982 births
OGC Nice players
Ivorian footballers
Ivorian expatriate footballers
Ivorian expatriates in France
Ivorian expatriates in England
Expatriate footballers in France
Expatriate footballers in England
Footballers from Abidjan